Death with dignity may refer to:

 
 
 Death with Dignity Act (disambiguation)
 

See also